Vaughan Grylls is a British artist, photographer, and author. Known for his fine art photography and sculptures, Grylls first received recognition for his 1960s pun-sculptures and, later, for his 1980s photography and panoramic photo collages.

Grylls was the director of Kent Institute of Art & Design before co-founding the University College for the Creative Arts at Canterbury, Epsom, Farnham, Maidstone & Rochester. He has work in various public collections including the National Library of Wales and University College London.

Initially trained as a sculptor, Grylls began creating photo collages in 1977. 
Some of his notable panoramic works include The Wailing Wall, Jerusalem (1979), Site of the Assassination of JFK (1980), and Britain Through the Looking Glass (1984).

Additionally, Grylls has authored seven books in the Then and Now series - Oxford Then and Now (2009), Cambridge Then and Now (2011), Singapore Then and Now (2016) Hong Kong Then and Now (2016) Shanghai Then and Now (2017), The Old West Then and Now (2019), London Then and Now (2020) and was photographer for Hollywood Then and Now (2013).

Early life and education 
Vaughan Grylls was born 10 December 1943 in Newark-on-Trent. He attended six different schools, including Southwell Minster School where he was a chorister and where he failed the 11+, Skegness Secondary Modern and Newark Magnus School (now Magnus Church of England Academy). From 1963 onwards, Grylls attended art schools at Nottingham, Wolverhampton, Goldsmiths, and the Slade School of Fine Art.

Career

Pun-sculptures 
At Goldsmiths College in 1968, Grylls produced an exhibition of his first photographically based pun-sculptures, each made from cardboard and called collectively 'Ludwig Wittgenstein's Palace of Pun.' He took this with him to the Slade School of Fine Art and continued to make more pun-sculptures. His work was noticed at his final show at the Slade in 1970 by Jasia Reichardt, art critic and assistant director of the ICA. His first London exhibition was held at the ICA in October 1970 as one room in an exhibition entitled 'Ten Sitting Rooms.'

Grylls' pun-sculpture work was also shown at an alternative exhibition space called The Gallery. The Gallery was opened in Lisson St, London in 1972 by fellow Slade graduate Nicholas Wegner. Wegner invited Grylls to show at The Gallery. The work Grylls exhibited in 1973 entitled 'An Indo-Chinese Punsculpture' was a large photo-mural commenting on the signing of the so-called Paris Peace Treaty. Wegner and Grylls then collaborated in an artistic partnership, inspired in part by Andy Warhol, from 1973 to 1975. Wegner closed The Gallery in 1978.

Photography 
Grylls' father died in 1977, and Grylls' style and focus changed thereafter. His style developed into works largely inspired by international news and political events. He used photographic montage techniques to create a collection of images pinned together to produce one large image.
In 1977 he travelled to Istanbul and used a telephoto lens to produce his first panoramic photo-collage, Hagia Sophia, Istanbul. It was exhibited in 1978 at the Whitechapel Art Gallery in London.

His next photo-collage exhibition was in 1979 called The Wailing (Western) Wall, Jerusalem and in Flanders Fields. Grylls said that his overtly political art tried, in the case of The Wailing (Western) Wall, Jerusalem, to "examine a cultural and religious icon that has had a far-reaching influence on political events today."

In 1980, Grylls created panoramic collages of the sites where President John F. Kennedy on Elm Street and Lord Mountbatten in Donegal Bay were murdered. William Feaver of The Observer referred to Grylls' work as "mixed-media surveys, combining epic scale and humdrum particulars."

In 1984, Grylls' 'Britain Through the Looking Glass', a twenty-eight by eight-foot work of colour Xerox photographs that were taken at the British Museum in London in the "Egyptian Mummy room" was exhibited at the Atlantis Gallery in London. Also, in the same exhibition, were two equally large panoramas, one based on the Greenwich Meridian, the other on Wembley Stadium.

Education 
In 1984, Grylls was appointed professor of photography and video at Williams College, Massachusetts. In 1989 Grylls returned to England to become Head of Art & Design at Wolverhampton Polytechnic (later known as the University of Wolverhampton) and in 1996 he became director of the Kent Institute of Art & Design.

In 2003, Grylls proposed creating a new university of 6000+ students studying art, design, and architecture by merging the Kent Institute with the Surrey Institute of Art & Design to prevent these free-standing art colleges becoming absorbed into their local universities. The merged institution was called the University College for the Creative Arts at Canterbury, Epsom, Farnham, Maidstone & Rochester (since 2009 the University for the Creative Arts). Grylls as founding Chief Executive of the merged institution resigned soon afterwards, announcing that he intended to return full-time to his own work.

In 2014, Grylls published his art school autobiography entitled I Brought This in Case: The 1960s, Four Art Schools and Me with a foreword by Sir Christopher Frayling, the popular culture critic and former Rector of the Royal College of Art.

In 2018, Bitter Lemon Press published Grylls' second autobiographical book, Have You Come Far? A Life in Interviews.

Exhibitions 

 February 2009:  Mother, Sadler's Wells
 May 2011:  Grandmother, Piper Gallery, London
 June–August 2012, with Edward Allington. Then and Now, The Piper Gallery, London
 November/December 2014: Retrospective 1967–2014, GX Gallery, London
 May 2018: 'Herman's Sermons and American Mail', A-side B-side Gallery, London

Notes

Further reading 

 Vaughan Grylls 'A Case in Point', The Sunday Times London 28 March 1971
 This is not an advertisement', Studio International London, Vol 182 no 935 July/August 1971
 Vaughan Grylls, 'Benefitting from a Holiday', The Sunday Times London 29 August 1971
 John A Walker, 'Contemporary Art, Flash Art Milan, nos 48/49 October/November 1974
 'Time, Words and the Camera' Exhibition catalogue edited by Jasia Reichardt and published by Neue Galerie am Landesmuseum Joanneum Graz, Austria 1976
 Vaughan Grylls, 'Artists Thoughts on the 70's in Words and Pictures'. Edited by Jasia Reichardt. Studio International, London, vol 195 no 991, 1981
 Brandon Taylor, Introductory essay to 'The Panoramic Image'. Exhibition catalogue published by John Hansard Gallery, University of Southampton 1981
 'Vaughan Grylls. Through the Looking Glass'. Exhibition catalogue with notes by the artist and an introductory essay by John Carlin. Published by the University of Wisconsin, Elvehjem Museum of Art, Madison, Wisconsin, November 1985
 'Vaughan Grylls. Wolverhampton Return'. Exhibition catalogue with notes by the artist and an introductory essay by Christopher Bailey. Published by Wolverhampton Art Gallery and Wolverhampton Polytechnic, September 1989
 'Vaughan Grylls.'White Man's Tales'. Exhibition catalogue with notes by the artist and an introductory essay by Professor Ann H Murray. Published by Wheaton College, Massachusetts, November 1994
 Sacha Craddock. Essay accompanying 'Mother', Sadlers Wells Theatre, London, February 2009
 James Putnam. Introductory essay to 'Then and Now'. Exhibition catalogue published by The Piper Gallery 2012 
 Megan Piper. Introductory essay to 'Vaughan Grylls' Retrospective exhibition catalogue published by GX Gallery 2014.

External links 
 Vaughan Grylls

1943 births
Living people
English artists
British conceptual artists
Academics of the University of Wolverhampton
Alumni of the University of Wolverhampton
Alumni of Goldsmiths, University of London
Alumni of University College London